The 1981 Taipei International Championships was a men's tennis tournament played on indoor carpet courts in Taipei, Taiwan that was part of the 1981 Volvo Grand Prix. It was the fifth edition of the tournament and was held from 9 November through 15 November 1981. Unseeded Robert Van't Hof won the singles title.

Finals

Singles
 Robert Van't Hof defeated  Pat Du Pré 7–5, 6–2
 It was Van't Hof's first singles title of his career.

Doubles
 John Benson /  Mike Bauer defeated  John Austin /  Mike Cahill 6–4, 6–3

References

External links
 ITF tournament edition details

Taipei Summit Open